Kozhevnia is a rural settlement in Shakhtarsk Raion, Donetsk Oblast, eastern Ukraine. It is part of Dmytrivka rural council and as of 2016 was still on file at Verkhovna Rada. As of 2001 it had a population of 42 people.

Demographics 
The 2001 census indicated a population of 42 people, categorized according to preferred mother tongue as 90% Ukrainian speaking and 7% Russian speaking. Most people living in the village identify as Ukrainian.

References

Rural settlements in Donetsk Oblast